The Fitzroy River (Darumbal: Toonooba) is a river located in Central Queensland, Australia. It is also the largest river basin that discharges onto the Great Barrier Reef.

Course and features
Formed by the confluence of the Mackenzie and Dawson rivers that drain the Expedition Range and the Carnarvon Range respectively, the Fitzroy River rises near Duaringa and flows initially north by east, then northward near the Goodedulla National Park. After flowing through Rockhampton, the river flows south by east past the Berserker Range past Humbug Point to the south of the Flat Top Range and eventually discharging into Keppel Bay in the Coral Sea near the MacKenzie Island Conservation Park.

From source to mouth, the Fitzroy River is joined by thirty-six tributaries including the Mackenzie River with its tributaries the Nogoa River, Comet River, Isaac River and its tributary Connors River; and the Dawson River which has two tributaries, the Don River and Dee River.

Catchment
The catchment stretches from the Carnarvon Range in the west to the rivermouth in Keppel Bay, near Rockhampton. It is bounded to the north by the Burdekin River catchment area and to the south by the Burnett River catchment area.

There are also a number important aquifers providing for groundwater extractions in the Fitzroy Basin.

The Fitzroy River basin is one of a number that experienced extensive flooding during the 2010–11 Queensland floods. In 2013, flash flooding in the Mount Morgan and Biloela regions brought major flooding to the lower Dawson River catchment. The Don River and the Dee River also rose to new record heights.

Reservoirs
The Fitzroy River catchment system has many weirs and dams, used for farming, mining and domestic consumption. In the Dawson River sub-catchment, the major reservoirs from source to mouth are the Glebe Weir, the Gyranda Weir, the Theodore Weir, the Moura Weir, the Callide Dam, and the Kroombit Dam. In the Mackenzie River sub-catchment, the major reservoirs are the Comet Weir, the Fairbairn Dam, the Theresa Creek Dam, the Bedford Weir, the Bingegang Weir, and the Tartrus Weir. In the main Fitzroy River sub-catchment the only reservoirs are the Eden Bann Weir and the Fitzroy River Barrage, with the latter capable of holding  when full, to provide potable water to Rockhampton city and surrounds.

History
The traditional owners of the area in the Fitzroy River catchment are the Darumbal people, notably the Baiali and Jetimarala clans. They called it Toonooba.

Yetimarala (also known as Jetimarala, Yetimaralla, and Bayali) is an Australian Aboriginal language of Central Queensland. Its traditional language region is within the local government areas of Central Highlands Region, on the Boomer Range and Broadsound Range and the Fitzroy River, Killarney Station, Mackenzie River and Isaac River.

The river was given its English name by European colonial settlers and pastoralists, Charles and William Archer, on 4 May 1853 in honour of Sir Charles FitzRoy, at the time the Governor of the Colony of New South Wales, as Queensland did not become a separate colony until 1859. The famous boatbuilder Colin Archer was the first known individual to sail up the river, with his cutter "Ellida".

During the 19th and early 20th centuries, the city was a major port, however rocky bars in the river prevented the Fitzroy from being used for navigation any further inland. As ships became larger, the lower reaches became less viable for commercial traffic, and today only pleasure craft and small commercial fishing boats use the river. Wharves which once lined the town reach at Rockhampton have now almost all disintegrated or been removed. Port Alma, in the Fitzroy River delta is now the nearest port to Rockhampton. Predominant industries in the catchment are coal mining, grazing and cotton.

It was originally settled in 1858, is listed on the Queensland Heritage Register and operates as a tourist attraction today.

The Fitzroy River in Rockhampton is often utilised for recreation.  The Rockhampton Ski Gardens on the Fitzroy River just upstream from the Fitzroy River Barrage is used by sporting groups such as the local water skiing, dragon boat and rowing clubs. In 2018, a $36 million revitalisation of the Fitzroy riverbank in Rockhampton City was officially opened.  Rockhampton's annual Rocky River Run is also held along the Fitzroy River. The annual fishing competition, the Barra Bounty is another event held on the Fitzroy River in Rockhampton. The city celebrates the Fitzroy River each year at the river's own annual festival, the Rockhampton River Festival.

In 2018, the Fitzroy River in Rockhampton was incorporated into the Queen's Baton Relay prior to the 2018 Commonwealth Games. After running his leg of the relay, batonbearer Mark Knowles handed the Queen's Baton to fellow batonbearer Craig McCormack who was then rowed across the river on a dragon boat as part of the relay.

Wildlife
The lower reaches of the river are home to salt water crocodiles. The most diverse range of freshwater fish in the country are found within the Fitzroy basin. The prized Australian fish, the barramundi, breeds in the river along with sooty grunter and a separate genetic strain of golden perch.

Some  of the river's floodplain and delta have been classified by BirdLife International as the Fitzroy Floodplain and Delta Important Bird Area (IBA).  It regularly supports over 1% of the world population of the sharp-tailed sandpiper as well as having a resident breeding population of the range-restricted mangrove honeyeater.

At the mouth of the river researchers have discovered a genetically distinct snubfin dolphins species with a population of just 70 animals.  The World Wildlife Fund had concerns that a planned coal port on Balaclava Island by Xstrata could wipe out the local snubfin population. In 2013 Glencore Xstrata halted its plans for the coal port due to high costs and massively reduced worldwide demand for coal. The firm cited a poor medium-term outlook for the coal industry.

Gallery

See also

References

External links

Map of the Fitzroy River catchment area, from Australia's Bureau of Meteorology

 
 

Rivers of Queensland
Rockhampton
Floods in Queensland
Important Bird Areas of Queensland
Bodies of water of the Coral Sea